"Wrestling Jacob", also known by its incipit, "Come, O thou traveller unknown", is a poem and hymn on the nature of God which appears in some Protestant hymnals. The text is attributed to Methodist minister Charles Wesley. It focuses on the change that can occur in one's own heart and is based on Genesis 32:24-32, which is the story of Jacob wrestling with an angel sent by God at Peniel.
 
It is sung to one of several tunes, including "Candler" (a traditional Scottish tune), "Wrestling Jacob" (by Samuel Sebastian Wesley), "David's Harp" (by Robert King) and Vernon (by Lucius Chapin). It is hymn number 386 in The United Methodist Hymnal (set to "Candler"); hymn number 434(i) (to "Wrestling Jacob") and 434(ii) (to "David's Harp") in Hymns and Psalms, among others.

Isaac Watts, the "Father of English Hymnody", remarked that Wesley's poem was "worth all the verses that he himself had written."

References

English Christian hymns
Methodism
18th-century Christian texts
Hymns by Charles Wesley
18th-century hymns